Mississippi Department of Archives and History (MDAH) is a state agency. It is the official archive of the Mississippi Government.

Location
The Mississippi Department of Archives and History is located in Jackson. The William F. Winter Archives and History Building was dedicated on November 7, 2003.

History
The Mississippi Department of Archives and History developed from the Mississippi Historical Society in the interest of promoting and protecting "Southern Identity" through acquisition and preservation of historical records, especially those records pertaining to the American Civil War.  Legislation authorizing creation of Department of Archives and History was signed by Mississippi Governor Andrew Longino on February 26, 1902. The Department of Archives and History is the second oldest state department of archives and history in the United States.

In 1902, Dunbar Rowland, an attorney and historian, was selected as the first Director of the department and served in that position until his death in 1937.

Mission
The mission of Mississippi Department of Archives and History:

Organizational structure and facilities
A director and nine-member board of trustees presides over the Mississippi Department of Archives and History and its five divisions, which include:
 Administration
 Archives and Records Services
 Historic Preservation
 Museums
 Programs and Communication

Administrative offices, as well as archivist work areas and archive storage areas, are located in the William F. Winter Archives and History Building.  Completed in 2003, the 6-story structure contains .

The Historic Preservation Division is housed in the Charlotte Capers Archives and History Building, located at 100 South State Street, Jackson.  This division administers Historical Markers in Mississippi, Mississippi Landmarks, and National Register of Historic Places in Mississippi.

The Museum Division provides administrative oversight for the following facilities and locations:
 Eudora Welty House
 Manship House Museum
 Old Capitol Museum
 Grand Village of the Natchez Indians
 Historic Jefferson College
 Windsor Ruins
 Winterville Mounds
 Museum of Mississippi History
 Mississippi Civil Rights Museum

The Programs and Communication Division, established in 2017, oversees programming, public information, publications, marketing, and education.

See also
 Charlotte Capers

References

External links

 
 "A Sense of Place", the MDAH blog
 Yates Construction: William Winters Archives and History Building

1902 establishments in Mississippi
Government agencies established in 1902
Government buildings in Mississippi
History of Mississippi
Office buildings in Jackson, Mississippi
Open government in the United States
Organizations based in Jackson, Mississippi
Research libraries in the United States
State agencies of Mississippi
State archives of the United States
State history organizations of the United States
Tourist attractions in Jackson, Mississippi